The International Mines Rescue Competition (IMRC) is a biennial event which facilitates the testing of underground emergency response capability across global mining and Mine Rescue jurisdictions.  The competition is held  by the governing mine rescue body of the host nation or jurisdiction.

The purpose of the IMRC is to present realistic simulations that will allow organizers to:

1. Evaluate skills required to perform rescue operations in a mining environment.
2. Judge participants in an open and transparent manner.
3. Provide feedback to all participants.
4. Promote Mine Rescue through improved communication, co-operation and knowledge transfer between responders, mine operators, suppliers, regulators and educators.

International Mine Rescue Competitions

2016 International Mine Rescue Competition

Ontario Mine Rescue hosted the  10th International Mines Rescue Competition (IMRC 2016) in Sudbury, Ontario.   The 2016 event marked the first time the competition was held in Canada.

See also
Drägerman and Drägerwoman

References

External links
2016 International Mines Rescue Competition
International Mines Rescue Body

Mine safety
Competitions